Canada competed at the 1988 Winter Paralympics in Innsbruck, Austria from January 17 to 25, 1988. Canada entered 20 athletes in two of the four disciplines at the Games; twelve in Alpine skiing and eight in Nordic skiing (cross-country skiing).

Medalists

See also
Canada at the 1988 Winter Olympics
Canada at the Paralympics

References

External links
Canadian Paralympic Committee official website
International Paralympic Committee official website

Nations at the 1988 Winter Paralympics
1988
Paralympics